The Star of Rio (German:Stern von Rio) may refer to:

  The Star of Rio (1940 film), a German film
  The Star of Rio (1955 film), a German-Italian remake